Headin' Home,  a 1920 American silent film

Headin' Home or Heading Home may also refer to:
 Headin' Home (Gary Wright album), 1979
 Headin' Home (Jimmy Owens album), 1978
 Heading Home, documentary film about underdog Israel national baseball team
 "Heading Home", a 2016 song by American musician Gryffin

See also
 The Sandlot: Heading Home, 2007 film directed by William Dear